Robert Graydon may refer to two Irish politicians:

 Robert Graydon (1671–1725), member of Parliament for Harristown from 1692 to 1693 and from 1695 to 1699
 Robert Graydon (1744–1800), member of Parliament for Harristown from 1768 to 1776, then for Kildare Borough from 1790 to 1797